Joey Janela's Spring Break is a professional wrestling event held by the American promotion Game Changer Wrestling (GCW). This event is traditionally held annually with appearances from top independent talent, retired wrestlers, and the event's namesake, Joey Janela.

The first event took place in March 2017 in Florida and it found annual success due to its proximity to WWE's WrestleMania. This event is now part of GCW's "The Collective", which is a week long series of wrestling events including GCW's  Bloodsport and Effy's Big Gay Brunch, as well as events from other promotions including Shimmer and Freelance Wrestling.

The signature match of Joey Janela's Spring Break is the "Clusterfuck Battle Royal". This match is similar to a traditional professional wrestling  Battle Royal, however it differs in that competitors are eliminated by pinfall, submission, being sent over the top rope, leaving the building, or "death". Regular competitors in the Clusterfuck Battle Royal are previously retired wrestlers, independent talent, and comedic gimmicks. This Battle Royal, along with the event itself, is known for its abundance of highspots, comedic wrestling, and campiness. Throughout this event it is not uncommon for wrestlers and referees to ignore the traditional professional wrestling rule set (i.e., interference, foreign objects, countouts).

Dates and venues

Events

Joey Janela's Spring Break

Joey Janela's Spring Break 2

Joey Janela's Spring Break 3 Part 1

Joey Janela's Spring Break 3 Part 2

Joey Janela's Spring Break 4

Notes

References

Professional wrestling shows
Professional wrestling in Florida
Professional wrestling in Indiana
Professional wrestling in Louisiana
Professional wrestling in New Jersey